Graham-Little syndrome is a cutaneous condition characterized by lichen planus-like skin lesions. It is named after Ernest Graham-Little.

See also 
 List of cutaneous conditions

References

External links 

 

Conditions of the skin appendages
Syndromes